The Nova Lux Ensemble is a Spanish choral group, an ensemble of la Coral de Cámara de Pamplona. The ensemble was formerly led by David Guindano Igarreta and is currently directed by Josep Cabré.

Discography

Miguel de Irízar Domenzain: Lamentaciones, motetes y tonos para Miserere.  Josep Cabré 2011
Urbán de Vargas: A casarse con el alma. Josep Cabré 2010 
Miguel Hilarión Eslava y Elizondo: Mass and motets.  David Guindano Igarreta 2008
Michael Navarrus: Primeras Vísperas para San Fermín.  David Guindano Igarreta 2007 2CD
Juan Frances de Iribarren Salmos, Villancicos y Cantadas. David Guindano Igarreta 2006  2CD 
Mateo Flecha el Joven Sento l'aura soave - Il primo libro de Madrigali. David Guindano Igarreta 2006 2CD

References

Early music groups
Spanish choirs
Basque classical musicians